The Guanipa Municipality is one of the 21 municipalities (municipios) that makes up the eastern Venezuelan state of Anzoátegui. The town of San José de Guanipa (El Tigrito) is the shire town of the Guanipa Municipality.

Demographics
The Guanipa Municipality, according to a 2007 population estimate by the National Institute of Statistics of Venezuela, has a population of 76,914 (up from 67,289 in 2000). This amounts to 5.2% of the state's population.

Government
The mayor of the San José de Guanipa Municipality is Pedro Martínez, elected on November 23, 2008, with 62% of the vote. He replaced Freddy Tomás Arriojas Boada shortly after the elections. The municipality is divided into one parish; Capital San José de Guanipa.

See also
San José de Guanipa (El Tigrito)
Anzoátegui
Municipalities of Venezuela

References

External links
guanipa-anzoategui.gob.ve 

Municipalities of Anzoategui